Martinsberg is a market town in the District Zwettl in the Austrian state of Lower Austria.

Geography 
About 43.1 percent of the municipality is forested.

Population

References

Cities and towns in Zwettl District